Folk Songs is a 2017 studio album by American string quartet Kronos Quartet, featuring classical and roots musicians Sam Amidon, Olivia Chaney, Rhiannon Giddens, and Natalie Merchant. It has received positive reviews from critics and was followed in 2020 by Long Time Passing, a collection of Pete Seeger songs by the Kronos Quartet.

Reception
Folk Songs received positive reviews from critics noted at review aggregator Metacritic. It has a weighted average score of 72 out of 100, based on four reviews. The editors of AllMusic Guide gave Folk Songs four out of five stars, with critic Mark Deming highlighting the arrangement and the quartet's ability to complement the vocalists. In Exclaim!, Peter Ellman rated this album a seven out of 10 for having versatility within the music, but criticizing that it "lingers a bit too much in a dark and dramatic mood".

Track listing
"Oh Where" (traditional, arranged by Nico Muhly) – 3:22
"Ramblin' Boy" (traditional, arranged by Donnacha Dennehy) – 5:49
"The Butcher's Boy" (traditional, arranged by Jacob Garchik) – 3:58
"Factory Girl" (traditional and Rhiannon Giddens, arranged by Gabriel Witcher) – 7:11
"Last Kind Words" (Geeshie Wiley, arranged by Jacob Garchik) – 3:20
"I See the Sign" (traditional, arranged by Nico Muhly) – 6:04
"Montague, que tu es haute" (traditional, arranged by Nico Muhly) – 2:32
"Johnny Has Gone for a Soldier" (traditional, arranged by Jacob Garchik) – 3:58
"Lullaby" (Rhiannon Giddens, arranged by Gabriel Witcher) – 3:36

Personnel
Kronos Quartet
Hank Dutt – viola
David Harrington – violin, additional production
John Sherba – violin
Sunny Yang – cello

Guest musicians
Sam Amidon – vocals on "Oh Where" and "I See the Sign", guitar on "Oh Where" and "I See the Sign"
Olivia Chaney – vocals on "Rambling Boys of Pleasure" and "Montague, que tu es haute", harmonium on "Rambling Boys of Pleasure", percussion on "Montague, que tu es haute"
Rhiannon Giddens – vocals on "Factory Girl" and "Lullaby"
Natalie Merchant – vocals on "The Butcher's Boy" and "Johnny Has Gone for a Soldier"

Technical personnel
Scott Fraser – mixing at Architecture, Los Angeles, California, United States
Evan Gaffney – design
Robert Hurwitz – executive production
Bob Ludwig – mastering at Gateway Mastering Studios in Portland, Maine, United States
Doug Petty – production
Todd Whitelock – engineering

See also
List of 2017 albums

References

External links

Press release from Nonesuch
Page from Merchant's site

2017 albums
Collaborative albums
French-language albums
Kronos Quartet albums
Sam Amidon albums
Olivia Chaney albums
Rhiannon Giddens albums
Natalie Merchant albums
Nonesuch Records albums